Schley is an unincorporated community in Huff Township, Spencer County, in the U.S. state of Indiana.

History
A post office was established at Schley in 1899, and remained in operation until it was discontinued in 1905. The community most likely was named after Winfield Scott Schley (1839–1911), an officer in the Spanish–American War.

Geography

References

Unincorporated communities in Spencer County, Indiana
Unincorporated communities in Indiana